Bärwalder See is a lake in Boxberg municipality, Görlitz district, Saxony, Germany. At an elevation of 125 m, its surface area is 12.99 km².

External links

LBarwalder See
Artificial lakes of Germany
Lakes of Saxony
Boxberg, Saxony